The 20th Grand Prix de la Marne was a non-championship Formula Two motor race held on 29 June 1952 at the Reims-Gueux circuit. It was the fourth round of the 1952 Les Grands Prix de France championship. Race distance was decided not by distance but by time, the duration being 3 hours. The race was won by Jean Behra driving a Gordini Type 16. Giuseppe Farina was second in a Ferrari 500, and his teammates Alberto Ascari and Luigi Villoresi shared third place, Villoresi's own car having suffered engine failure. Ascari set pole and fastest lap.

Classification

Race

References

Marne
Marne
Marne